The Błyskawica radio station ("Lightning" radio station) was an insurgent radio transmitter broadcasting from Warsaw during the Warsaw Uprising of 1944, since 8 August 1944 until the end of the struggle. The transmitter was constructed by Antoni Zębik pseudonym "Biegły". Its signal was the melody of Warszawianka.

Initially, the radio station was placed in the building of PKO (Pocztowa Kasa Oszczędności, Engl.: Postal Savings Bank) in Jasna 9 street. On 25 August it was moved to the "Adria" cafe in Moniuszki 10 street. On 4 September it was relocated to the building of the former USSR embassy in Poznańska 15 street and then to the Public Library in Koszykowa 26 street.

The chief of the team was Stanisław Zadrożny pseudonym "Pawlicz". His deputy was Zofia Rutkowska pseudonym "Ewa", who assumed the care of the performance of the program. Jan Nowak-Jeziorański together with an RAF airman John Ward conducted English-language broadcasts. Zbigniew Świętochowski pseudonym "Krzysztof", Stefan Sojecki, Zbigniew Jasiński and Mieczysław Ubysz worked as speakers. News and reports were carried by Jacek Wołowski.

The first words broadcast by this radio station, spoken by Zbigniew Świętochowski, were the following:

The radio broadcast also on the medium wave a subversive program addressed to Wehrmacht soldiers, as part of the "N" Action.

On 4 October, when the uprising was drawing near the end, it broadcast the last, 10-minute long, message. After this transmission, the radio station was destroyed by the then chief of the team Jan Georgica pseudonym "Grzegorzewicz".

A replica of "Błyskawica" radio station is in the Museum of the Warsaw Uprising. In "Jednodniówka" - a paper published on 1 August 2004 by this Museum, it was written that: 

"The replica of "Błyskawica" basically does not differ from the original. The creators took care of every detail, even using original knobs. The only difference is that the contemporary "Błyskawica" transmits on a different waveband: 7.043 MHz, because the waveband of the time of the Warsaw Uprising is now used by (sic!) NATO".

During the Warsaw Uprising, it also used another transmitter, called "Burza" ("Tempest") constructed by Włodzimierz Markowski. It broadcast from 3 August in the building of the Main Post Office on Plac Napoleona (now Plac Powstańców Warszawy).

External links

Interview with Antoni Zębik - creator of the "Błyskawica" radiostation
Website with photos of the celebration of putting the radiostation into operation
Reportage "moja Błyskawica" (My "Błyskawica") realised by the Reportage Studio of the Polish Radio. IT is dedicated to Antoni Zębik
 Fragments of original messages transmitted by "Błyskawica" radiostation

Home Army
Warsaw Uprising
Radio stations in Poland
Mass media in Warsaw
Defunct mass media in Poland